The Mid-Hoosier Conference is a seven-member IHSAA-sanctioned athletic association located within Bartholomew, Decatur, Johnson, and Shelby Counties in Central Indiana.

History
The conference was formed in 1964 by seven schools from Bartholomew (Hauser), Brown (Brown County), and Shelby (Southwestern, Triton Central, Waldron) counties as a conference for smaller schools south of Indianapolis. Johnson County schools Edinburgh and Whiteland would join in 1965. The conference had some roster changes in its early years, as Whiteland outgrew the MHC and moved to the Mid-State, while Indian Creek and South Decatur joined as newly consolidated schools. Triton Central left in 1969, and was replaced by Crothersville. South Decatur would join the Eastern Indiana Athletic Conference in 1973, but would return in 1977. The league would once again go through changes in the 1980s, as North Decatur (1980) and Morristown (1985) would join, and Crothersville would leave to become a full-time member of the Southern Athletic Conference, having been a member of both the MHC and the SAC since the latter's inception in 1974.

The league would stay stable until the late 1990s, as Triton Central rejoined from the Rangeline Conference, bringing membership to 10. This would be short-lived, however, as Brown County would join the reformed Western Indiana Conference in 1999. Triton Central would join the Indiana Crossroads Conference in 2012. The MHC would respond by bringing in two former White River Conference schools, Eastern Hancock and Knightstown. Both schools were scheduled to join in 2013, but Eastern Hancock was able to arrange its scheduling to join in 2012.

Indian Creek will however be leaving and joining the Western Indiana Conference (WIC). Indian Creek will also begin playing in the WIC Football Conference as well as a result of S. Vermillion leaving the WIC and returning to the WRC (Wabash River Conference). Eastern Hancock and Knightstown also decided to end their affiliation with the conference that year, with both scheduled to begin the process of joining new conferences in the fall of 2017.

All of the football-playing schools of the MHC participate in the Mid-Indiana Football Conference.

Membership

 Edinburgh played concurrently in the MHC and JCC 1965-67.
 South Decatur played in the EIAC 1973-77.

Former Members 

 Crothersville played in both the MHC and SAC from the SAC's inception in 1974 until leaving the MHC in 1983.

Membership timeline

State Champions
IHSAA State Champions

Hauser Jets (2)
 2006 Boys Basketball (A)
 2015 Softball (A)

Morristown Yellow Jackets (2)
 2003 Volleyball (A)
 2018 boys basketball (A)

South Decatur Cougars (1)
 1990 Football (A)

Triton Central Tigers (1)
 2003 Baseball (2A)

Waldron Mohawks (1)
 2004 Boys Basketball (A)

References

Resources 
 IHSAA Conferences
 IHSAA Directory

Indiana high school athletic conferences
High school sports conferences and leagues in the United States